Philip Bennis (born 1942) is an Irish retired hurler and manager. At club level he played for Patrickswell, winning several Limerick Senior Championship titles, and was the right wing-back on the Limerick senior hurling team that won the 1973 All-Ireland Championship.

Widely regarded as one of the Patrickswell club's all-time greats, Bennis's career lasted for nearly twenty years. During that time he and his six brothers contributed to much success, with Bennis winning five Limerick Senior Championship medals.

Early life

Phil Bennis was born in Patrickswell, County Limerick.  He was born into a large family of seven boys and six girls, and from an early age he showed a great interest in the game of hurling.

Playing career

Club
Bennis played his club hurling with his local Patrickswell team. He enjoyed some success at underage levels before later winning several senior county championship titles throughout the 1960s and 1970s.

Inter-county

Bennis first tasted major hurling success in 1971 when he won a National Hurling League medal with Limerick.  It was the first of five consecutive league final appearances, however, Limerick lost the other four games.  Two years later in 1973 Bennis won a senior Munster title.  He later won an All-Ireland medal following a victory over Kilkenny in the final.

Managerial career

Limerick

Bennis served as manager of the Limerick senior hurling team for two separate spells in the late 1980s and early 1990s.  He had some success with the side including the winning of a National Hurling League title in 1992, but failed to capture either Munster Championship, or All Ireland success.  The closest he got was to contest the 1992 Munster Final against Cork in Semple Stadium, Thurles, but Limerick lost on a scoreline of 1-22 to 3-11.

Teams

References

1942 births
Living people
Patrickswell hurlers
Limerick inter-county hurlers
Hurling managers
All-Ireland Senior Hurling Championship winners